The Canadian Aerodrome Company was the first commercial enterprise in the British Empire to design and manufacture aircraft. The company was formed following the dissolution of Alexander Graham Bell's Aerial Experiment Association. The company was established by Frederick W. "Casey" Baldwin and J.A.D. McCurdy in 1909, with the financial backing of Alexander Graham Bell. The company was headquartered in Baddeck, Nova Scotia at the Kite House at Bell's Beinn Bhreagh estate. 

The Canadian Aerodrome Company manufactured aircraft based on the AEA Silver Dart, producing the Baddeck No. 1, and the Baddeck No. 2 as well as a separate commissioned design, the Hubbard Monoplane (Hubbard II) before the company was dissolved in 1910.

References
Notes

Citations

Bibliography

 Green, H. Gordon. The Silver Dart: The Authentic Story of the Hon. J.A.D. McCurdy, Canada's First Pilot. Fredericton, New Brunswick: Atlantic Advocate Book, 1959.
 Harding, Les. McCurdy and the Silver Dart. Sydney, Nova Scotia: University College of Cape Breton, 1998. .
 Milberry, Larry. Aviation in Canada: The Pioneer Decades, Vol. 1. Toronto: CANAV Books, 2008. .
 Molson, Ken M. and Harold A. Taylor. Canadian Aircraft Since 1909. Stittsville, Ontario: Canada's Wings, Inc., 1982. .
 Payne, Stephen, ed. Canadian Wings: A Remarkable Century of Flight. Vancouver: Douglas & McIntyre, 2006. .
 Petrie, A. Roy. Alexander Graham Bell. Richmond Hill, Ontario, Canada: Fitzhenry & Whiteside, 1992. .

External links

 Baddeck no. 2 in Flight, 9 April 1910
 Their Flying Machines: Baddeck No. 1 and No. 2
 Baddeck no. 1
 Canadian Aerodrome Company

1900s Canadian aircraft
Alexander Graham Bell